The following is a list of tornado events by year.

Number of tornadoes in United States by year and intensity

See also 
 List of tornadoes and tornado outbreaks
 List of tornadoes by calendar day

References

External links 
  (The Tornado Project)
  (Storm Events Database)

 by year
 by year